Nimrin was a Palestinian Arab town depopulated by Israel during the 1948 Arab-Israeli War.

Nimrin may also refer to:
Beth-Nimrah, also called Nimrin and Bethennabris, an ancient city in Transjordan
Shunet Nimrin, a former populated place in the Jordan Valley by Wadi Nimrin
Tell Nimrin, an archaeological site
Wadi Nimrin, a tributary of  the Jordan River

See also
Nimrim